Bommarillu is a 2006 Indian Telugu-language romantic comedy film directed and co-written by Bhaskar in his directorial debut, and produced by Dil Raju. The film stars Siddharth, Genelia, Prakash Raj and Jayasudha. The film primarily revolves around the relationship between a father and son, in which the father's excessive concern for his son, and interference in his life, leads to the latter harbouring bitterness towards his overbearing father. The cinematography was handled by Vijay C Chakravarthy and editing done by Marthand K. Venkatesh. The music for the film was composed by Devi Sri Prasad, whose soundtrack of the film received positive reviews from critics.

The film opened to Indian audiences on 9 August 2006. On its way to winning state honours and rave reviews, the film went on to win several Filmfare Awards among other prominent awards and was one of the highest grossing Telugu films of that year. Following the film's box office success, it was remade in Tamil as Santosh Subramaniam (2008), in Bengali as Bhalobasa Bhalobasa (2008), in Odia as Dream Girl (2009), and in Hindi as It's My Life (2020).

Plot
Aravind is a father who strives to provide his children more than what they ask for, often overriding their choices. Aravind's youngest son, Siddharth aka Siddhu, however, does not want to be controlled as such. He is determined that two crucial aspects of his life — career and life partner — shall be chosen by him alone. One day, Aravind asks Siddhu if he would join their construction company. Siddhu, who desires to start his own company, lies that he is yet to finish a course and asks for more time. The following week, Aravind gets Siddhu engaged to Subbalakshmi without his consent. Subbalakshmi, like Siddhu, is a child whose life is micromanaged by her father. Much to Siddhu's dismay, she doesn't seem to mind it.

When contemplating his options at a temple, Siddhu accidentally meets Haasini and is attracted to her energetic nature and cheerfulness. The couple begins to meet regularly. As the days go by, Siddhu grows to admire the ever-friendly Hasini as someone who does what she loves and he discovers many small things which make him happy to be in her company. Soon he realizes that he has fallen in love with her.

Alongside this, Siddhu applies for a bank loan to start his own construction company. When his love for Haasini deepens, he proposes to her while also confessing that he is engaged to Subbalakshmi against his wishes. On learning this, Haasini, though dejected for a while, comes back to him a few days later. She advises Siddhu to break off his engagement, indirectly accepting his proposal. At this juncture, the ecstatic Siddhu is seen by a furious Aravind. On being admonished by Aravind back home, Siddhu expresses his disinterest in marrying Subbulakshmi. When asked for a reason to like Haasini, Siddhu replies that if they let Haasini stay with their family for a week, all their questions shall be answered. He also convinces Haasini to stay at his house after lying to her father, Kanaka Rao that she is going on a college tour.

When Haasini is introduced to Siddhu's family, she gets a lukewarm welcome. As she settles down, they begin to like her. Haasini finds it difficult to adapt to the living habits of the authoritarian Aravind's household but stays for Siddhu's sake. Meanwhile, Aravind reprimands Siddhu when he finds out about his bank loan and career plan, only to further enrage Siddhu. During this phase, Siddhu and Haasini begin to grow apart owing to the tensions in the house.

One day, the family attends a wedding where Haasini cheers up the ceremony with her joyous nature. Coincidentally, Kanaka Rao who happens to be around recognizes Siddhu as the drunken young man whom he encountered on an earlier occasion. Haasini realizes her father's presence and quickly exits to avoid his attention. After saving their face, Siddhu admonishes Haasini for her antics at the wedding. The sullen Haasini moves out of the house saying that she does not find Siddhu the same and that she cannot put on an act if she continues her stay in the house. After getting back to her home, she rebuilds the trust her father has in her while Siddhu is left forlorn. Siddhu's mother, Lakshmi confronts Aravind on Siddhu's choices and wants. In the process, Siddhu opens up his heart, leaving Aravind to repent on his overprotectiveness. Siddhu requests Subbulakshmi and her parents to call off the marriage. While they relent, Aravind tries to convince Kanaka Rao about Siddhu and Haasini's love. When Kanaka Rao disapproves, Aravind suggests to let Siddhu stay with them for a week. After a week's stay, Kanaka Rao is convinced, letting the couple unite.

Cast

 Siddharth as Siddharth "Siddhu" 
 Genelia as Haasini Rao
 Prakash Raj as Addala Aravind, Siddhu's father
 Jayasudha as Lakshmi, Siddhu's mother
 Kota Srinivasa Rao as Kanaka Rao, Haasini's father
 Sunil as Satti, Siddhu's servant
 Satya Krishnan as Siddhu's sister-in-law
 Sudeepa Pinky as Siddhu's sister
 Dharmavarapu Subramanyam as Kismat Kumar
 Surekha Vani as Siddhu's elder sister
 Chitram Seenu as Kedimangina Sreenu, Siddhu's friend
 Vijay Sai as Vamsi, Siddhu's friend
 Ravi Varma as Ravi, Siddhu's friend
 Neha Bamb as Subbalaxmi, Siddhu's fiancée
 Bill Bitra as Chintu
 Brahmanandam as Loan Officer
 Tanikella Bharani as Subbalaxmi's father
 Chalapathi Rao as Vamsi's father
 Venkata Sriram as Gautham, Siddhu's brother
 Saptagiri as Haasini's lover
 Stunt Silva as College student
 Raghunatha Reddy 
 Narsing Yadav as Motorcycle driver
 Shobi (special appearance in "Kani Ippudu")

Production

Development
Prior to Bommarillu, Bhaskar assisted Dil Raju in Telugu films such as Arya (2004) and Bhadra (2005). On the sets of the film Arya, Raju offered Bhaskar a film to direct. On the sets of Bhadra, Bhaskar narrated the story to Raju and the saga began. Thus, Bommarillu became the first directorial venture for Bhaskar. In an interview, he said that the story for the film began taking shape in as early as 1997 when he wrote about a father and a son's relationship. However, when the plans of making the film arose, an element of love between the protagonists was added. In the interview, he said that the script, to an extent, is autobiographical. He cites personal examples of some scenes from the film such as the choice of clothes for Siddhu by Aravind, the head-bump between the lead actors and Lakshmi singing in the kitchen.

In an interview, Vijay C Chakravarthy, the cinematographer for the film, said that Dil Raju offered him the position in November 2005. For the film, Vijay said that he made use of Arriflex 435 camera and Hawk lenses. In another interview, Bhaskar said working with Abburi Ravi, his co-writer, was unique. They used to converse in a closed room with a voice recorder, allowing the dialogues in the script to be natural. He also heaped praise on Marthand K. Venkatesh, the film's editor. This meant a reduction in the runtime by 25 minutes.

Casting
The choice of Siddharth was because of the sheer relevance to the character in real life. However, they finalized the choice of the actor only after the script was ready. The choice of Genelia was based on her natural vivacity in real life. This and her eyes, according to Bhaskar, made her an obvious choice for her character. More so, she liked the one line story that Raju told and also a few scenes that he narrated to her. She immediately liked the character and consented for the role. The fact that her co-actor, Siddharth and she acted earlier together in Boys (2003), made them more comfortable to work with. The camaraderie that the lead actors shared during the filming, added to their good performances. The choice of Prakash Raj was easy as he befitted the character he portrayed while, Jayasudha was persuaded to play the role of the lead actor's mother. Savitha Reddy rendered the voice for Genelia's character in the film.

Filming 
The shooting of the film took about three and a half months. The palatial house where the entire family stayed in the film is part of Ramanaidu Studios at Nanakramguda, Hyderabad. Several modifications were done by the art director, Prakash. A couple of the songs were shot in a montage, another couple in Frankfurt am Main and other places in Germany and one song each in this house set and at a temple in Kakinada.

Soundtrack

For the film's music and soundtrack, Raju renewed his previous association (Arya and Bhadra) with Devi Sri Prasad. Siddharth sung one of the tracks from this film. The film has seven songs composed by Devi Sri Prasad with the lyrics primarily penned by Chandrabose, Ravi Kumar Bhaskarabhatla, Kulasekhar and Sirivennela Sitaramasastri. The audio of the film released nationwide on 21 June 2006. A repository of Indian songs has recommended the feel-good soundtracks to the audiences.

Release
Bommarillu was released worldwide with 72 prints. Owing to the success of the film, the number of reels grew to about hundred. It collected a distributors share of 5 crore in its opening week in India. Released in six major metros in the United States, the film collected $73,200 (then approximately 0.3 crore) within the first four days of screening. A September 2006 survey done in the United States by a popular entertainment portal revealed that the film was watched by an Indian expatriate population of 65,000, which generated a revenue of 3 crore at that time. A cumulative gross revenue for the film was reported to be as 25 crore including 3.5 crore from overseas, the largest for any Telugu film at that time. This film had given Siddarth stardom in Telugu cinema.

Reception

Critical reception
The film received critical acclaim right for the story and the performances. One entertainment portal suggests the film to the entire family. It goes on to applaud Siddharth, Genelia and Prakash Raj, the three prime actors from the film for their performances. Similar reviews were voiced out by other such portals, many of which pointing out no real flaws from the film.

Hourdose reviewed it by stating "‘Bommarillu’ is a pure example of a director's faith in his script and his screenplay. All the wonderful performances of the lead cast and some nice talent from the crew made the film a grand success. This film is surely one of the most well-written and innovative films that Tollywood has produced in recent years."

Controversies 
The film had its own share of controversies. A news report showcased the omnipresent piracy in the Telugu film industry by quoting the cheap prices at which the film was being sold. The film's lead actor, Siddharth even went on to request the audiences to buy the original audio CD. The film's producer, Dil Raju, ensured a special code on each distributed print to track piracy with a warning for copyright violation which would incur a fine or a jail term.

In April 2007, a case of copyright infringement was filed on the film's producer and director that prompted a court to stall the screening of the film. The allegation pointed out that the film was made based on a compilation of short stories that was released in 1997.

Remakes 
Jayasudha's efforts to remake this film in Hindi with Amitabh Bachchan and Abhishek Bachchan were unsuccessful. A Hindi remake of the film titled It's My Life was started by Boney Kapoor in 2007, and scenes were shot with Harman Baweja and Genelia. The film remained unreleased for over a decade, before having a direct-to-television premiere on 29 November 2020. The film was remade in Tamil, Bengali and Odia languages under the titles Santosh Subramaniam, Bhalobasa Bhalobasa and Dream Girl, respectively, in 2008 and 2009. Although it was remade in Bengali, the film was also dubbed in that language as Ki Likhi Tomay.

Awards

Home media
The DVD version of the film was released on 4 June 2007 and distributed by I Dream Dvd internationally. It is available in 16:9 Anamorphic widescreen, Dolby Digital 5.1 Surround, progressive 24 FPS, widescreen and NTSC format.

References

External links 
 

2006 films
Indian romantic musical films
Films directed by Bhaskar
Films scored by Devi Sri Prasad
Telugu films remade in other languages
Indian romantic comedy films
Films set in Hyderabad, India
Films shot in Hyderabad, India
2000s Telugu-language films
2006 romantic comedy films
2006 directorial debut films
Sri Venkateswara Creations films